St Ursula's College, Yeppoon, is the only all-girls, Catholic day and boarding secondary school (years 7-12) in Central Queensland, Australia.

History
The school's history began in 1915 when Bishop Joseph Shiel proposed a Branch House for the Sisters of the Presentation of the Blessed Virgin Mary be established at Yeppoon.

Mother Ursula Kennedy and Mother Patrick Madden, two Presentation Sisters, visited Yeppoon and selected a one-acre block in Queen Street for the construction of the branch house, which at the suggestion of Bishop Shiel became known as St Ursula's.

The two-storey St Ursula's Convent, with St Joseph's Primary School on the ground floor, was officially opened by Bishop Joseph Shiel on 21 January 1917.  Twenty-five boarding students and thirty primary students began attending the school 29 January 1917.

With a demand for specialised education for young woman becoming apparent, St Ursula's College was officially opened at the site on 12 March 1918, with an enrolment of 32 students.  The primary school was on the ground floor, with the secondary school on the first floor.

In 1922, a new building was erected which is now called Gabriel Hogan House.

With a surge in the number of primary school students in the 1950's, it was decided to establish a separate school with the Sacred Heart Primary School opening in John Street in 1958.  Sacred Heart Primary School relocated again in 1991, to Lammermoor.

In 1992, the Presentation Sisters formed St Ursula's College Limited, ensuring the school would continue to follow the Presentation tradition after religious leadership had stopped.

The first lay principal of St Ursula's College was Margaret Ramsay, who was appointed in 1996.  However, the Presentation Sisters remained on the staff at St Ursula's College until 2011.

The Queensland Presentation Congregation transferred governance of St Ursula's College to Mercy Partners in June 2014.

A century of catholic education and presentation presence on the Capricorn Coast was celebrated in July 2017.

In 2018, St Ursula's College celebrated the school's centenary with a three days of celebrations.

School
According to the school's website, St Ursula's College provides a holistic Catholic education and residential environment, founded on the charism of Nano Nagle and the values of the Presentation Sisters, "but responsive to the demands created by the social dynamics of the 21st century".

The College campus is located in the Yeppoon central business district. The Boarding House is a three-storey Queenslander-style building that accommodates the changing needs of boarding students. Plans were submitted to Livingstone Shire Council in 2021 for a proposed expansion of the school. The plans included the construction of a new two-storey education block with new amenities, courtyard and covered area which would replace an existing building which would be demolished.

The college's "sister school" is St Agnes' Girls School in Kyoto.

Students from St Ursula's College regularly collaborate with students from St Brendan's College to hold stage musicals for the community of Yeppoon.

Notable staff
Chris Dawson, a former rugby league player, began working at the school as a physical education teacher in 1998. In 2003, he was put on light duties and had his contact with students revoked during the 2003 coronial inquest into the 1982 disappearance of his wife, Lynette Dawson.
Rosa MacGinley, a presentation sister and academic was the head of the school from 1954 to 1967.
Courtney Winfield-Hill, cricketer and rugby league player, was working as a physical education teacher in 2010.

References

External links

Boarding schools in Queensland
Catholic secondary schools in Queensland
Alliance of Girls' Schools Australasia
Presentation Sisters schools
Girls' schools in Queensland
Educational institutions established in 1918
Catholic boarding schools in Australia
1918 establishments in Australia
Yeppoon
Buildings and structures in Central Queensland